Atzori is an Italian surname. Notable people with the surname include:

Daniel Atzori (born 1981), Italian writer
Fernando Atzori (1942-2020), Italian flyweight boxer
Gianluca Atzori (born 1971), Italian football player and manager
Simona Atzori (born 1974), Italian artist and dancer

Italian-language surnames